Frank Louis Bertaina (April 14, 1944 – March 3, 2010) was an American pitcher in Major League Baseball who played from  through  for the Baltimore Orioles (1964–67, 1969), Washington Senators (1967–69), and St. Louis Cardinals (1970).

Bertaina made his major league debut on August 1, 1964, against the Kansas City Athletics at Municipal Stadium. He started and gave up two earned runs in seven innings pitched, but did not receive a decision in the 5–2 Orioles victory.

With Baltimore and Washington in 1967 he went 7–6 with a 2.99 ERA and a career-high 86 strikeouts, while tying for ninth in the American League with four shutouts. That season, he was part of a trade on May 29, when the Orioles shipped him and rookie slugger Mike Epstein to Washington for veteran left-hander Pete Richert.

In a seven-year career, Bertaina posted a 19–29 record with 3.84 ERA in 100 pitching appearances, including 66 starts, five shutouts, six complete games and 10 games finished, giving up 208 runs (176 earned) on 399 hits, while striking out 280 and walking 214 in 413 innings of work.

During his minor league career, Bertaina led the Eastern League in winning percentage (.733) in 1964 while pitching for the Elmira Pioneers, topped the International League in strikeouts (188) with the Rochester Red Wings in 1965, and won the International League winning percentage title (.800) with the 1970 Red Wings.

Bertaina died in Santa Rosa, California at the age of 65, following complications from a heart attack.

References

External links

Retrosheet
Baseball Library

1944 births
2010 deaths
Aberdeen Pheasants players
Baltimore Orioles players
Baseball players from San Francisco
Elmira Pioneers players
Major League Baseball pitchers
Rochester Red Wings players
St. Louis Cardinals players
Tulsa Oilers (baseball) players
Washington Senators (1961–1971) players